Long Kuan Jiu Duan were a Chinese electronic duo who experienced brief success 2002–2004 before disbanding in 2005. The duo consisted of female singer Long Kuan (龙宽) (formerly of the British-based pop-punk band Mika Bomb) and guitarist Jiu Duan (“九段” real name Tian Peng 田鹏).

Discography
Wo ting zhezhong yinyue de shihou zui ai ni 我听这种音乐的时候最爱你 CD
Shijue luxing 视觉旅行 DVD

References

Chinese musical groups
Year of birth missing (living people)
Living people